Ronald Patrick Escheté (born August 19, 1948) is an American seven-string jazz guitarist. He is the first person to record a cover version of "Christmas Time Is Here", which Vince Guaraldi wrote for the Charlie Brown television program.

Career
When Escheté was fourteen, he began playing guitar. During the late 1960s, he studied classical guitar and flute at Loyola University in New Orleans. From 1969–1970, he worked in Las Vegas supporting singer Buddy Greco. He moved to Los Angeles, where he played with Dave Pike and Gene Harris.

Escheté has been an educator since the early 1970s when he taught at community colleges in southern California. In the mid 1970s, he began teaching at the Musicians Institute in Hollywood and in the 1990s at California State University at Long Beach. He has written several instruction books, such as The Jazz Guitar Soloist and Melodic Chord Phrases.

His early influences were jazz guitarists Wes Montgomery, Jim Hall, and Howard Roberts. He has played with Ray Brown, Ella Fitzgerald, Dizzy Gillespie, Milt Jackson, and Diana Krall.

Discography

As leader
 Spirit's Samba (JAS, 1977)
 To Let You Know I Care (Muse, 1979)
 Line-Up (Muse, 1981)
 Christmas Impressions (Music Is Medicine, 1982)
 A Beautiful Friendship (Discovery, 1982) with Dewey Erney
 The Second Set (Sounds Great, 1984) with Dewey Erney 
 Stump Jumper (Bainbridge, 1986)
 Mo' Strings Attached (The Jazz Alliance, 1993)
 A Closer Look (Concord Jazz, 1994)
 Rain or Shine (Concord Jazz, 1995)
 Soft Winds (Concord Jazz, 1996)
 The Sunset Hour (Holt, 1998)
 Live at Rocco (RevJazz, 2000)
 No Place to Hide (SMS Jazz, 2002) with Mort Weiss
 Homeward Bound (RevJazz, 2003)
 In the Middle: Live at Spazio (RevJazz, 2006)
 All Too Soon (SMS Jazz, 2008) with Mort Weiss
 How My Heart Sings: Live at Steamers (BluePort, 2017)

As sideman
With Gene Harris
 Hot Lips (JAM, 1982)
 Nature's Way (JAM, 1984)
 Listen Here! (Concord Jazz, 1989)
 Black and Blue (Concord Jazz, 1991)
 Like a Lover (Concord Jazz, 1992)
 A Little Piece of Heaven [live] (Concord Jazz, 1993)
 Funky Gene's (Concord Jazz, 1994)
 Brotherhood (Concord Jazz, 1995)
 It's the Real Soul [live] (Concord Jazz, 1996)
 In His Hands (Concord Jazz, 1997)
 Down Home Blues (Concord Jazz, 1997) with Jack McDuff

With Dave Pike
 Times Out of Mind (Muse, 1976)
 On a Gentle Note (Muse, 1978)
 Let the Minstrels Play On (Muse, 1980)
 Moon Bird (Muse, 1983)

With others
 Ernestine Anderson, Be Mine Tonight (Concord Jazz, 1987)
 Ernestine Anderson, Now and Then (Qwest/WB, 1993)
 Ray Anthony, 1988 & All That Jazz (Aero Space, 1988)
 Lanny Aplanalp, Natural Colors (Autumn Down, 2002)
 Jeff Berlin, Taking Notes (Denon, 1997)
 Ray Brown, Don't Forget the Blues (Concord Jazz, 1986)
 Judy Chamberlain, Road Trip (JazzBaby, 2002)
 John Clayton & Jeff Clayton, The Clayton Brothers (Concord Jazz, 1979)
 James Darren, This One's from the Heart (Concord Jazz, 1999)
 Joey DeFrancesco, Falling in Love Again (Concord Jazz, 2003)
 Jan Deneau Trio, Different Shades of Blue (Maria, 1973)
 The Four Freshmen, Four Freshmen and Friends (Four Freshmen Society, 2015)
 Tommy Gumina, Polycolors (Polytone, 1990)
 Niki Haris, Dreaming A Dream (BMG, 1997)
 Luther Hughes, Luther Hughes & Cahoots (Contemporary, 1987)
 Jacintha, Jacintha Is Her Name (Groove Note, 2003)
 Milt Jackson, Big Mouth (Pablo, 1981)
 Rick Jarrett, Back to Romance (Soulful Sonance, 2001)
 Diana Krall, Live in Paris (Verve, 2002) [on bonus track (of Canadian release)]
 Craig Larson Trio, Legacy (Larson Jazz, 2002)
 Warne Marsh, Two Days in the Life of... (Interplay, 1987)
 Jack McDuff, Color Me Blue (Concord Jazz, 1992)
 Don Rader, Anemone (Jet Danger, 1980)
 Don Rader, A Foreign Affair (L&R/Bellaphon, 1991)
 Herman Riley, Herman (JAM, 1984)
 Charlie Shoemake, Strollin'  (Chase, 1991)
 Andy Simpkins, Calamba (Discovery, 1989)
 Keely Smith, I'm in Love Again (Fantasy, 1985)
 Mary Stallings, I Waited for You (Concord Jazz, 1994)
 Mary Stallings, Spectrum (Concord Jazz, 1996)
 Dan St. Marseille, Retrospection (Resurgent, 1995)
 Mort Weiss, Mort Weiss Meets Joey DeFrancesco (SMS Jazz, 2002)
 Mort Weiss, The Three Of Us: The Mort Weiss Trio (SMS Jazz, 2003)
 Mort Weiss, The Four of Us: The Mort Weiss Quartet Live at Steamers (SMS Jazz, 2005)
 Steve Wilkerson & Joey DeFrancesco, It's A Blues Sorta Thing (Dane, 1999)
 James Zollar, Soaring With Bird (Naxos, 1997)

References

External links
Ron Escheté Interview - NAMM Oral History Library (2011)

1948 births
Living people
People from Houma, Louisiana
Loyola University New Orleans alumni
American jazz guitarists
Seven-string guitarists
20th-century American guitarists
Jazz musicians from Louisiana